Misery is the sixth studio album by Australian metalcore band the Amity Affliction. The album was released on 24 August 2018. It is the first album without drummer Ryan Burt, following his departure in February 2018. It is the first album to feature Joe Longobardi on drums. However, during recording and the release of this album, he was only a session drummer. He was not made official until the end of 2018. It is also the first album to feature Joel Birch performing clean vocals on some tracks on the album along with the album being a departure from the band's usual straight metalcore sound and instead included some electronic elements on top of the metalcore sound. It is the band's final album for Roadrunner and UNFD.

Track listing

Personnel
Credits for Misery adapted from liner notes.

The Amity Affliction
 Joel Birch – lead vocals, art direction, design, photography
 Dan Brown – guitars, backing vocals
 Ahren Stringer – co-lead vocals, bass, art direction

Additional personnel
 Alex Krotz – engineering
 Shane Collins - additional lyrics 
 Joe Longobardi – drums, percussion
 Matt Squire – keyboards, synthesizer, programming, production
 Eric Taft – engineering, additional production
 Josh Wilbur – mixing, mastering
 Caleb Williams – management

Charts

References

2018 albums
The Amity Affliction albums
Roadrunner Records albums
UNFD albums
Albums produced by Matt Squire
Albums recorded at Noble Street Studios